Clear Creek is a minor tributary of the Upper Mississippi River entirely contained within Allamakee County, Iowa. It enters the Mississippi into Navigation Pool 9 through the city of Lansing, Iowa. Iowa Highway 9 runs through its canyon. It has been restored as fishing stream for brown trout. The stream gives its name to Clear Creek Park in Lansing.

See also
List of rivers of Iowa

References

Tributaries of the Mississippi River
Rivers of Allamakee County, Iowa
Rivers of Iowa